Shir Barat (also Romanized as Shīr Barāt; also known as Shīrīn Barād) is a village in Shirin Su Rural District, Shirin Su District, Kabudarahang County, Hamadan Province, Iran. At the 2006 census, its population was 221, in 49 families.

References 

Populated places in Kabudarahang County